There have been four baronetcies created for members of the Wills family, owners of W. D. & H. O. Wills and major shareholders and directors of the Imperial Tobacco Company. All four creations were in the Baronetage of the United Kingdom.

The Wills Baronetcy, of Blagdon in the County of Somerset, was created in the Baronetage of the United Kingdom on 12 August 1893 for William Henry Wills, the first chairman of the Imperial Tobacco Company, formed by the merger of W.D. & H.O. Wills (founded in Bristol by his grandfather Henry Overton Wills I (1761–1826)) with 12 other smaller UK tobacco manufacturers. He was elevated to the peerage in 1906 as Baron Winterstoke, but died without issue in 1911, when the baronetcy and the barony became extinct. For more information on this creation, see the latter title.

The Wills Baronetcy, of Northmoor & Manor Heath, was created in the Baronetage of the United Kingdom on 15 February 1897 for Frederick Wills. He was a director of the Imperial Tobacco Company and a first-cousin of the first Baronet of the 1893 creation. For more information on this creation, see the Baron Dulverton.

The Wills Baronetcy, of Hazelwood Stoke Bishop, in Westbury-on-Trym in the County of Gloucester and Clapton-in-Gordano in the County of Somerset, was created in the Baronetage of the United Kingdom on 19 August 1904 for Edward Payson Wills, the elder brother of the first Baronet of the 1897 creation. He was a director of the Imperial Tobacco Company. The second and third Baronets were also Directors of the Imperial Tobacco Company. The latter also served as Lord-Lieutenant of Wiltshire from 1930 to 1942.

The Wills Baronetcy, of Blagdon in the County of Somerset, was created in the Baronetage of the United Kingdom on 19 July 1923 for George Alfred Wills (first cousin once removed of the 1st baronet "of Blagdon", the first creation of 1893 (Baron Winterstoke), who died without issue when his titles became extinct). He was president of the Imperial Tobacco Company. The second Baronet was a director of the Imperial Tobacco Company. The fourth Baronet served as Lord-Lieutenant of Avon and Somerset and as Pro-Chancellor of the University of Bath.

Wills baronets, of Blagdon (1893)
see Baron Winterstoke

Wills baronets, of Northmoor and Manor Heath (1897)
Sir Frederick Wills, 1st Baronet (1838–1909)
see Baron Dulverton

Wills baronets, of Hazelwood and Clapton-in-Gordano (1904)
Sir Edward Payson Wills, 1st Baronet (1834–1910)
Sir Edward Chaning Wills, 2nd Baronet (1861–1921)
Sir Ernest Wills, 3rd Baronet (1869–1958)
Sir (Ernest) Edward de Winton Wills, 4th Baronet (1903–1983)
Sir (David) Seton Wills, 5th Baronet (born 1939)

Wills baronets, of Blagdon (1923)
Sir George Alfred Wills, 1st Baronet (1854–1928)
 Sir George Vernon Proctor Wills, 2nd Baronet (1887–1931)
 Sir George Peter Vernon Wills, 3rd Baronet (1922–1945)
Sir John Vernon Wills, 4th Baronet (1928–1998)
Sir David James Vernon Wills, 5th Baronet (born 1955)

See also
Henry Overton Wills III

Notes

References
Kidd, Charles, Williamson, David (editors). Debrett's Peerage and Baronetage (1990 edition). New York: St Martin's Press, 1990,

External links
Sir Ernest Wills, 3rd Baronet

Baronetcies in the Baronetage of the United Kingdom
Extinct baronetcies in the Baronetage of the United Kingdom
Imperial Brands